Little Princess may refer to:
A Little Princess, a 1905 children's novel by Frances Hodgson Burnett
A Little Princess (Lippa musical), a 2004 musical adaptation by Andrew Lippa
The Little Princess (1917 film), starring Mary Pickford
The Little Princess (1939 film), starring Shirley Temple
A Little Princess (1973 miniseries), starring Deborah Makepeace
A Little Princess (1986 miniseries), starring Amelia Shankley and Maureen Lipman
A Little Princess (1995 film), starring Liesel Matthews and Eleanor Bron
Sarah... Ang Munting Prinsesa, a 1995 Filipino film adaptation starring Camille Prats, Angelica Panganiban and Jean Garcia
A Little Princess (1997 film), starring Anastasia Meskova
Shōkōjo Seira, a 2009 Japanese film adaptation
Little Princess (automobile), a cyclecar built by the Princess Cyclecar Company
Little Princesses, a UK charity
Little Princess (TV series), a children's animated television series
Little Princess (album), a 2009 album by Tim Sparks
"The Little Princess", a religious tract published by Chick Publications
The Little Princesses, a non-fiction book by Marion Crawford about her time as governess for Princess Elizabeth
Little Princess (Philippine TV series), a Filipino television drama romance series starring Jo Berry

Games
Little Princess: Maru Oukoku no Ningyou Hime 2, a 1999 RPG from the Marl Kingdom series

See also
Princess (disambiguation)
Little Prince (disambiguation)